Paralephana nigriciliata is a moth of the family Erebidae first described by George Hampson in 1910.

Distribution
It is found in Ghana, Tanzania and Zambia.

References

Calpinae